Kvammen is a small village located on the south side of the Førdefjorden in Askvoll Municipality in Vestland county, Norway.

Historically, this area of Askvoll was part of the old Vevring municipality. The village of Indrevevring lies just to the north on the other side of the fjord. Kvammen Chapel is located in this village.

References

Villages in Vestland
Askvoll